Redox-regulatory protein FAM213A also known as peroxiredoxin-like 2 activated in M-CSF stimulated monocytes (PAMM) is a protein that in humans is encoded by the FAM213A gene.

References

Further reading